The Good Times is a 1986 album by American pop singer Neil Sedaka. It was originally issued on the Curb label in the US and by Precision Records and Tapes Ltd. in the UK.

With one exception, the album consists almost entirely of material co-written by Neil Sedaka and his daughter Dara, and she is featured singing duets with her father in two tracks. The one exception is a new version of Sedaka's 1975 hit, "The Hungry Years", which he co-wrote with Howard Greenfield.

Track listing
 "Love Made Me Feel This Way"
 "Sweet Dreams Of You" (with Dara Sedaka)
 "Rosarita"
 "The Hungry Years"
 "Wonderful World Of Love"
 "The Good Times" (with Dara Sedaka)
 "Let Me Walk With You Again"
 "Paint Me Again"
 "Tomorrow Never Came"

Singles
Curb Records issued one single, "Love Made Me Feel This Way", which did not chart.

CD release
In 1986, Precision Records & Tapes (PRT) issued this album on CD in Europe (from master tape). A bootleg reissue (from vinyl) was released in 2013.

Neil Sedaka albums
1986 albums